Dasineura folliculi is a species of gall midge that induces galls on several species of goldenrod in North America. It was first described by Ephraim Porter Felt in 1908. Adults live for only one to three days, mating near the goldenrod before laying eggs between leaves. Larvae are gregarious, with anywhere between five to eighty in a gall. The larvae mature within three to four weeks of hatching.

References

Cecidomyiidae
Gall-inducing insects
Taxa named by Ephraim Porter Felt
Insects described in 1908

Diptera of North America